Volunteer Defence Corps may refer to:
Volunteer Defence Corps in Australia
Volunteer Defense Corps in Thailand
 Hong Kong Volunteer Defence Corps, last named the Royal Hong Kong Regiment
Shanghai Volunteer Corps